BE or be may refer to:

Linguistics
 To be, the English copular verb
 Be (Cyrillic), a letter of the Cyrillic alphabet
 be (interjection), in several languages
 Be language or Ong Be, a language of northern Hainan province, China
Black English, or African-American Vernacular English, an English dialect
 be – ISO 639-1 code for Belarusian language

Music

Albums
 Be (Beady Eye album), 2013
 Be (Casiopea album), 1998
 Be (Common album), 2005
 BE (Pain of Salvation album), 2004
 BE (Original Stage Production), a 2005 live album by Pain of Salvation
 Be (BTS album), 2020

Songs
 "Be" (Neil Diamond song), a 1973 single
 "Be", a song by Jessica Simpson from In This Skin
 "Be", a song by Lenny Kravitz from Let Love Rule
 "Be", a song by Slade from Whatever Happened to Slade

Organisations
 Be Inc., a former US software company (1990–2001) and developer of the Be Operating System (BeOS)
 Be Unlimited, a former UK Internet service provider (2003–2014)
 Badminton Europe, the governing body of badminton in Europe
 British Eventing, the British governing body for the equestrian sport of eventing
 BearingPoint (former stock ticker symbol BE)
  or Left Bloc, a Portuguese political party
 Bob Evans Restaurants, an American restaurant chain

Places
 Bè, a neighborhood in Togo
 Belgium (ISO 3166-1 and FIPS 10-4 country code: BE)
 Berlin, a state of Germany

 Canton of Bern, a canton of Switzerland

Science and technology
 Base excess (BE), excess or deficit in the amount of base in the blood
 Beryllium, symbol Be, a chemical element

Computing
 .be, the country code top-level domain for Belgium
 Backup Exec, backup and recovery software from Veritas Software
 Big-endian, a system that stores the most significant byte of a word at the smallest memory address
 BeOS, an operating system by Be

Physics
 Baumé scale (°Bé), a density scale
 Be star, in astronomy, a B-type star
 Bejan number (Be), in thermodynamics and fluid mechanics

Transportation
 BE Be Electric, Electric Car Manufacturing Company
 Baltimore and Eastern Railroad Company (B&E), US
 Beriev (design office prefix: Be), a Russian aircraft manufacturer
 Flybe (1979-2020), former English airline
 Flybe, (2022-2023) former English airline
 British European Airways (IATA airline code BE until 1974)

Other uses
 Bé (footballer), Portuguese footballer
 Bachelor of Engineering, an academic degree
 Bahá'í Era, in timekeeping
 Buddhist Era, in timekeeping

See also
 B (disambiguation)
 Bay (disambiguation)
 BBE (disambiguation)
 Bebe (disambiguation)
 Bee (disambiguation)